Kondapi Assembly constituency is a SC (Scheduled Caste) reserved constituency of Andhra Pradesh Legislative Assembly, India. It is one of 8 constituencies in the Prakasham district.

Overview
It is part of the Ongole Lok Sabha constituency along with another six Vidhan Sabha segments, namely, Yerragondapalem, Darsi, Ongole, Markapuram, Giddalur and Kanigiri in the Prakasam district.

Mandals

Members of Legislative Assembly

Election results

Assembly elections 2019

Assembly elections 2014

Assembly Elections 2009

Assembly Elections 2004

Assembly elections 1999

Assembly elections 1994

Assembly elections 1989

Assembly elections 1985

Assembly elections 1983

Assembly elections 1978

Assembly elections 1972

Assembly elections 1967

Assembly elections 1962

Assembly elections 1955

See also
 List of constituencies of Andhra Pradesh Legislative Assembly

References

Further reading
 

Assembly constituencies of Andhra Pradesh